St George's College Boat Club is a rowing club on the River Thames, based at Sunbury Lane, Walton-on-Thames, Elmbridge, Surrey.

History
The club belongs to the St George's College, Weybridge and the boathouse sits next to Walton Rowing Club.

The club has produced multiple British champions.

Honours

British champions

See also
Rowing on the River Thames

References

Sport in Surrey
Rowing clubs in England
Rowing clubs of the River Thames
Scholastic rowing in the United Kingdom